Christina Black (born October 21, 1987) is a Canadian curler from Halifax, Nova Scotia. She currently skips her own team out of the Dartmouth Curling Club in Dartmouth, Nova Scotia.

Career
Black joined Team Mary-Anne Arsenault for the 2014–15 season at third. The team, along with second Jane Snyder and lead Jennifer Baxter, won two tour events early in the season, the Dave Jones Molson Mayflower Cashspiel and the Gibson's Cashspiel. They also won the 2015 Nova Scotia Scotties Tournament of Hearts, qualifying them for the 2015 Scotties Tournament of Hearts, Black's first. There, the team finished in seventh place with a 5–6 record. In 2016, Jennifer Crouse joined at second when Snyder left the team. A few seasons later, they won the 2018 Nova Scotia Scotties Tournament of Hearts and won a bronze medal at the 2018 Scotties Tournament of Hearts. Later that year, the team won the 2018 New Scotland Clothing Ladies Cashspiel.

The Arsenault rink began the 2019–20 season by winning the 2019 Curling Store Cashspiel. The team won the provincial Scotties again in 2020, and represented Nova Scotia at the 2020 Scotties Tournament of Hearts with new lead Emma Logan. The team finished pool play with a 4–3 round robin record, in a tie with British Columbia's Corryn Brown rink. They lost to British Columbia in a tiebreaker, failing to advance.

In 2020, Arsenault announced she was moving to British Columbia. Black formed a new rink as skip with Baxter at third and front end Karlee Jones and Shelley Barker. In their first event together, the team won the 2020 Curling Store Cashspiel. The 2021 Nova Scotia Scotties was cancelled due to the COVID-19 pandemic in Nova Scotia, so the Nova Scotia Curling Association appointed Team Jill Brothers to represent the province at the 2021 Scotties Tournament of Hearts. Team Black would have been selected as the Nova Scotia representatives, however, they did not retain three out of their four players from the previous season.

Team Black won their first event of the 2021–22 season, The Curling Store Cashspiel, going undefeated to claim the title. They also reached the final of the Atlantic Superstore Monctonian Challenge, losing to the Andrea Crawford rink. In November, the team once again went undefeated to win the Tim Hortons Spitfire Arms Cash Spiel, defeating former teammate Jennifer Crouse in the final. At the 2022 Nova Scotia Scotties Tournament of Hearts, Team Black won all three qualifying events, winning the provincial title and securing their spot at the 2022 Scotties Tournament of Hearts. At the Hearts, Black led her rink to a 5–3 record in the round robin, which was enough to qualify for the championship round. Along the way, she scored victories over higher seeded teams such as Alberta's Laura Walker and Manitoba's Mackenzie Zacharias. She also defeated British Columbia, which was being skipped by former teammate Mary-Anne Arsenault. In their championship round match against Northern Ontario's Krista McCarville, Team Black got down 9–1 before coming back to make the game 9–8, eventually losing 11–8. This eliminated them from the championship.

Black also played third for Brent MacDougall, representing Nova Scotia at the 2013 Canadian Mixed Curling Championship, where they were finalists, as well as the 2018 Canadian Mixed Curling Championship.

Personal life
Black works as an SSI Supervision Specialist for Scotiabank. She attended Saint Mary's University.

Teams 
Black has played with the following women's curling teams:

References

External links

1987 births
Living people
Canadian women curlers
Curlers from Nova Scotia
People from Sydney, Nova Scotia
Sportspeople from the Cape Breton Regional Municipality
Sportspeople from Halifax, Nova Scotia
Saint Mary's University (Halifax) alumni